The Embassy of the Republic of Indonesia in Athens is the diplomatic mission of the Republic of Indonesia to the Hellenic Republic (Greece). Diplomatic relations between Indonesia and Greece were established since the opening of the Indonesian embassy in Belgrade, Yugoslavia, which was accredited to Greece. The Indonesian embassy in Athens opened on 5 January 1994 with Sunyoto Pamungkas as the first Indonesian ambassador to Greece.

See also 

 Greece–Indonesia relations
 List of diplomatic missions of Indonesia
 List of diplomatic missions in Greece

References 

Athens
Indonesia
Buildings and structures in Athens